Picasso Trigger (released in the Philippines as Secret Agent 7) is a 1988 action film starring Steve Bond, Dona Speir, Hope Marie Carlton, Roberta Vasquez, Cynthia Brimhall, and Harold Diamond. It was written and directed by Andy Sidaris and it's the third installment in the Triple B series.

Plot

Cast
Steve Bond as Travis Abilene
Dona Speir as Donna Hamilton
Hope Marie Carlton as Taryn
Harold Diamond as Jade
John Aprea as Salazar
Bruce Penhall as Hondo
Cynthia Brimhall as Edy
Dennis Alexio as Toshi Lum
Keith Cooke as Clayton
Wolf Larson as Jimmy-John
Andy Sidaris as Whitey
Kym Malin as Kym
Patty Duffek as Patticakes
Liv Lindeland as Inga

Release
Picasso Trigger was released in the United States in February 1988. In the Philippines, the film was released as Secret Agent 7 on March 18, 1992.

See also
Girls with guns

References

External links

Picasso Trigger on NanarLand

1988 films
1980s spy action films
American spy action films
Films directed by Andy Sidaris
1980s English-language films
1980s American films